Andrew (Andy) Michael Stevens (born December 4, 1987) is an American water polo goalkeeper. While playing at  Loyola Marymount University, Los Angeles, he was a 4-Time All-American. Previously he played for the United States Mens National Team, and most recently competed for Team USA at the 2013 FINA World Championships.

Career

High school 

Stevens played water polo at Villa Park High School in Orange County from 2002 to 2005. In 2004 and 2005, he was named to the California-Hawaii All-America first team and in 2005 was also OC Registers All-Orange County Team Goalkeeper.

College 

Stevens then went to Loyola Marymount University, where he redshirted the 2006 season. 

In 2007, he started 28 games as goalkeeper and had a 7.8 goals against average he finished the season as Honorable Mention All-American, the Western Water Polo Association (WWPA) Newcomer of the Year including All-WWPA Honorable Mention, WWPA All-Tournament second-team and LMU Athletics' Male Newcomer of the Year.

The following year in 2008, he started 31 games, had a 7.15 goals against average, and was named to was named third-team All-American, first-team All-NCAA Tournament, the WWPA Player of the Year, first-team All-WWPA, MVP of the WWPA Tournament, first-team WWPA All-Tournament as well as LMU Male Athlete of the Year.

Stevens started 28 games in 2009. He had 321 saves and a 6.15 goals against average. Following the season, he was named Western Water Polo Association (WWPA) Player of the Year (Making him the first player in his programs history to earn back-to-back Player of The Year Honors), Third-Team All-American, First-Team WWPA All-Conference, WWPA Tournament MVP, First-Team WWPA All-Tournament, First-Team NCAA All-Tournament, LMU Male Co-Athlete of the Year.

In 2010, in his last and final collegiate season he started 29 games, made 305 saves, and had a 6.41 goals against average. His performance helped LMU reach the NCAA Championships for the fourth year in a row. In his last year he finished the season as second-team All-American, first-team All-WWPA, WWPA Tournament MVP, first-team WWPA All-Tournament, and for the third year in a row he was the only goalkeeper to be named first-team NCAA All-Tournament. 

He finished his college career with 1,232 total saves, setting a school record.

United States National Team 

Stevens has been a goalkeeper for the U.S. National Team since 2005 and most recently competed in the 2013 FINA World Championships, in Barcelona, Spain.

USA Men's Senior National Water Polo Team

 2013 FINA World Championships, Barcelona, Spain
 2013 FINA World League Super Final, Chilyabinsk, Russia
 2013 UANA World Aquatic Championships, Calgary, Canada
 2012 Olympic Alternate
 2012 Pan Pacific Tournament, Melbourne, Australia
 2011 FINA World Championships, Shanghai China
 2011 26th World University Games, Shenzen, China
 2010 FINA World Cup, Oradea, Romania
 2010 FINA World League Super Final, Nis, Serbia
 2010 4th Volvo Cup International Tournament in Hódmezővásárhely, Hungary
 2009 25th World University Games in Belgrade, Serbia
 2009 3rd Volvo Cup International Tournament in Eger, Hungary

USA Junior National Team

 2005 Six Nations Water Polo Tournament in Cosenza, Italy
 2006 Pan American Games in Montreal, Canada 1st Place
 2007 FINA Junior World Championships in Long Beach, CA 6th Place
 2007 Low Tatras Cup in Novaky, Slovakia 2nd place,
 2007 L.E.N. Zagreb Cup in Zagreb, Croatia 4th place

Professional Highlights 

Stevens previously played for Vaterpolo Klub Radnički Kragujevac located in Kragujevac, Serbia.

 2013 LEN Cup Champion (European Champions)

Personal 

Stevens was born in Arcadia, California, on December 4, 1987. He is 6 feet, 3 inches tall. He resides in Orange, California.

References 

1987 births
Living people
Olympic water polo players of the United States
Sportspeople from California
People from Arcadia, California
People from Orange, California
American male water polo players